Kentucky Route 43 (KY 43) is a state highway in Kentucky that runs from BUS KY 55 and Boone Station Road northeast of Shelbyville to U.S. Route 421 (US 421) southeast of Pleasureville.

Route description
KY 43 begins at an intersection with KY 55 Bus./KY 2268 in Shelbyville, Shelby County, heading to the east on two-lane undivided Cropper Road. The road passes through a mix of farmland and woodland with some homes, running to the north of a R.J. Corman Railroad line. The route curves northeast and intersects the western terminus of KY 1005. KY 43 passes through more rural areas while paralleling the railroad tracks, turning north and east before coming to the western terminus of KY 12. Here, the route turns north to remain on Cropper Road, passing through more agricultural areas with some woods. The road turns east before a curve back to the north as it continues through more rural areas. KY 43 intersects the southern terminus of KY 241 and turns east to pass a few homes in the community of Cropper. The route continues through more farmland with some trees and comes to a junction with the northern terminus of KY 395. KY 43 continues north-northwest through more rural areas before it ends at an intersection with US 421.

Major intersections

References

0043
Transportation in Shelby County, Kentucky